Nelson Laurence (born 19 October 1984) is a Seychellois football player.  He is a striker playing for the Seychelles national football team.

International career

International goals
Scores and results list Seychelles' goal tally first.

References

External links

1984 births
Living people
Seychellois footballers
St Michel United FC players
Seychelles international footballers
Place of birth missing (living people)
Association football forwards